Jetix Europe N.V. (formerly known as Fox Kids Europe N.V.) was a European television broadcasting company that owned children's television channels and programming blocks across the Europe and Middle East, such as Jetix and Jetix Play.

History

Fox Kids Europe

Formation
In September 1995, Fox Broadcasting Company and Saban Entertainment announced they had formed a strategic partnership in the creation of children's programming networks worldwide under the Fox Kids umberella. The networks would capitalize on Saban's library and Fox-parent News Corp.’s distribution strength. The venture launched their first international Fox Kids Network branded channel in the United Kingdom on October 19, 1996.

After the successful launch of Fox Kids UK, five additional Fox Kids networks were launched between 1997 and 1999 for the Netherlands, France, Poland, Scandinavia and Spain.

On April 1, 1999, the Central & Eastern Europe feed was launched for the CIS and Baltic countries.

Going Public
Fox Kids Europe became a publicly traded company in November 1999 with Fox Family Worldwide holding a 75.7% majority stake and the other 24.3% being listed on the Amsterdam Stock Exchange.

In 2000, five additional Fox Kids feeds launched: Italy, Turkey, Germany, Hungary and the Middle East. These launches made Fox Kids the only children's entertainment company with a local channel in every major European market.

In Late-2000, Saban Entertainment reconsolidated their European licensing subsidiary based in the United Kingdom – Saban Consumer Products Europe, as a subsidiary of Fox Kids Europe.

In February 2001, a Fox Kids feed was launched in Israel, while the Hungarian feed was extended to the Czech Republic and Slovakia, while launching in Russia as a programming block on free-to-air channel Ren TV. In June 2001 Fox Kids Europe announced that the Fox Kids brand had become the most widely distributed children's channel in Europe and the Middle East, reaching 24.9 million households and broadcasting in 54 countries via 11 channel feeds in 16 languages.

In the Summer of 2001, the Italian Fox Kids channel launched a syndicated block for several local stations in Italy.

Purchase by The Walt Disney Company
On July 23, 2001, it was announced that The Walt Disney Company would purchase Fox Family Worldwide for $2.9 billion, which included FFW's majority stake in Fox Kids Europe, which was completed on October 24, 2001 The original intention of The Walt Disney Company for the Fox Kids Europe networks after the acquisition was to rebrand all operations as Toon Disney, a channel that had very little distribution internationally but this was scrapped, and the company was instead granted a non-fixed term license with 20th Century Fox Film Corporation to continue using the "Fox Kids" brand at no charge.

In November 2001, a Greek service was launched with limited 13 hours following a 2-hour block launched in October.

In December 2002, the company signed with BMG Europe for two Fox Kids Hits music compilation albums per year for 10 European markets.

In January 2003, Fox Kids Europe launched their first sister network - Fox Kids Play, in Poland. The channel later extended to CEE and MENA regions, and the brand was also used for other usages, such as a  VOD channel on UK cable provider Telewest.

In April 2003, Saban Consumer Products Europe was renamed as Active Licensing Europe.

by 2003, Fox Kids Europe had extended to 34.8 million households in 57 countries via 12 channel feeds in 17 languages.

In October 2003, it was announced that John de Mol Jr. had purchased a 5.1% stake in Fox Kids Europe. This stake was later expanded to 10.2%.

Jetix Europe

Introduction and Rebranding
In January 2004, Fox Kids Europe, Fox Kids Latin America and the ABC Cable Networks Group agreed to rename its then current operations under a single brand, called Jetix, which helped strengthen its then operations into a single force. The Jetix name was chosen after the company conducted international research specifically with a number of children's focus groups. Many of the children picked the name as it implied action and adventure, and the company was able to use the name internationally due to its ambiguity. Bruce Steinberg, chairman and chief executive officer of Fox Kids Europe, explained that Jetix would help strengthen Fox Kids Europe's partnership with Disney while building new alliances to continue to successfully leverage its programming library and distribution.

The pre-launch period began with the launch of Jetix branded blocks on the Fox Kids networks which would transition to the rebrand once the name would become more familiar. The UK feed added the Jetix-branded block in April. The following month saw the subsidiaries begin to adopt the Jetix brand, with Active Licensing Europe becoming Jetix Consumer Products on 4 May 2004. following suit with Fox Kids Europe changing to Jetix Europe on 14 July 2004.

The rebranding of the Fox Kids channels to Jetix began with the Franch channel's rebranding on 28 August 2004 and ending with the German channel's rebranding on 10 June 2005.

Later History
In May 2005, Jetix Europe subsidiary Jetix Italia launched a male teen channel called GXT on Sky Italia

SIP Animation co-produced a few animated series with Jetix Europe during the 2000s.

On March 23, 2006, the pre-1989 DIC Entertainment catalogue, consisting of 20 shows which had been held by Jetix Europe and Disney since 2001, was re-acquired by DIC. In December, John De Mol Jr.'s stake in Jetix Europe was increased to 17.4%.

In 2008, Jetix Europe licensed out Jetix France to The Walt Disney Company France and Disney-ABC-ESPN Television became its channel distribution partner. In February 2008, Jetix Europe was in talks to join affiliated companies, Disney Channel Europe, ESPN Europe and Disney–ABC International Television (DAIT), in their combined distribution sales unit. In June, Jetix Europe agreed to have DAIT take over distribution sales for all channels across Europe, the Middle East and Africa. In November, the Central and Eastern European channel team won gold in the U.K. Promax Awards for Jetix Max idents.

Full purchase by The Walt Disney Company
On December 8, 2008, Disney made an agreement to increase ownership in Jetix Europe to 96%, with intentions to purchase the remainder and have Jetix Europe delisted from the Euronext Amsterdam exchange. By 2009, Disney had owned 99.8% of the company.

On 15 July 2009, Jetix Europe subsidiary Jetix Italy S.r.l. announced that they would undergo a management buyout and rebrand as Switchover Media, and announced that they would purchase the GXT and K2 networks and blocks from The Walt Disney Company. The company also agreed to operate Jetix Italy for Disney until its rebranding as Disney XD Italy.

Disney XD was expected to be rolled out to European territories in 2009. Later, however, Disney announced that the Jetix channel in certain countries (Hungary, Romania, Czech Republic, Slovakia, Russia, Bulgaria and Israel) will be renamed to Disney Channel, marking that channel's first introduction in these countries. The change took place on September 19, 2009, in the CEE region.

On September 19, 2009, Disney Channel replaced Jetix in Bulgaria, the Czech Republic, Hungary, Moldova, Romania and Slovakia. But the Russian feed was still broadcasting under the Jetix name until it was announced that a separate Disney Channel would launch. After the launch of Disney Channel in Romania and Bulgaria, the Jetix feed in Russia began to be independent and got localized, with Russian titlecards and banners with Russian hours.

The last Jetix channel to switch over to Disney XD was the Dutch version on January 1, 2010.

The last Jetix channel to close was the Russian version, which was rebranded as Disney Channel on Tuesday, August 10, 2010.

The Jetix Play channels soon followed suit in 2010/2011, being replaced with Playhouse Disney/Disney Junior.

Remnants of Jetix Europe continued until around 2012–2014 to wind down operations and as an overhang period to fully integrate Jetix into Disney. European Disney XD co-productions such as Rekkit Rabbit and have the Disney XD logo in the credits, but "Jetix Europe Properties SARL, Luxembourg, Zurich Branch" is credited underneath.

As a legal entity, the UK subsidiary (which was mostly responsible for the operational side of Jetix) ceased to exist on March 11, 2019. However, other UK-based Jetix divisions, Jetix Entertainment Limited and Jetix Consumer Products UK Limited continued to exist until March 11, 2019, although by then Jetix's functions were already integrated into Disney. The Dutch subsidiary which mostly handled the corporate side of Jetix had its final shareholders meeting on March 22, 2012.

Co-commissioned and produced shows

For Fox Kids Europe

 Jason and the Heroes of Mount Olympus (2001–2002) (Co-produced with Saban International Paris, TF1, Fox Kids International Programming, and Fox Family Properties)
 Living with Lionel (2001–2003) (Co-produced with Unbound Studios Inc.)
 What's with Andy? (2001–2004, seasons  1–2) (Co-produced with Teletoon, CinéGroupe, Saban Entertainment (Season 1), and SIP Animation (Season 2)
 Gadget & the Gadgetinis (2002–2003) (Co-produced with SIP Animation, Fox Kids International Programming, DIC Entertainment Corporation, Channel Five, M6 Métropole Télévision, Mediatrade S.P.A., and ABC Family Properties)
 Pig City (2002–2003) (Co-produced with CinéGroupe, AnimaKids Productions, Red Rover Studios Limited, SMEC Animation & Graphic Technology, ProSieben, and Teletoon)

For Jetix Europe
 The Tofus (2004) (Co-Produced with France 3, Teletoon, SIP Animation and CinéGroupe)
 W.I.T.C.H. (2004) (Co-produced with France 3, SIP Animation and The Walt Disney Company)
 A.T.O.M. (2005) (Co-produced with SIP Animation)
 Monster Warriors (2006) (Co-produced with Coneybeare Stories)
 Galactik Football (2006, Seasons 1–2) (Co-produced with Alphanim and France 2, in association with Welkin (Season 1), Hosem (Season 1), Audi'Art, LuxAnimation (Season 1), Supersonic (Season 1), Europool (Season 2), and Carloon (Season 2))
 Shuriken School (2006) (co-produced with Xilam Animation, Zinkia Entertainment, in association with France 3)
 Team Galaxy (2006) (Co-produced with Marathon Media, Image Entertainment Corporation, in association with France 3)
 Ōban Star-Racers (2006) (Co-produced with Sav! The World Productions, in association with HAL FilmMaker, Bandai Visual, and France 3)
 Pucca (2006) (Co-produced with Studio B Productions and VOOZ Character System)
 Monster Buster Club (2008) (Co-produced with Marathon Media and Image Entertainment Corporation, in association with YTV and France 3)
 Combo Niños (2008) (Co-produced with SIP Animation and TF1)
 Kid vs. Kat (2008, Season 1) (Co-produced with Studio B Productions, in association with YTV)
 Marvo the Wonder Chicken (2008/2009, Season 1) (Co-produced with Red Kite Animation and The Dandy)
 Jimmy Two-Shoes (2009, Season 1) (Co-produced with Breakthrough Entertainment and Mercury Filmworks, in association with Teletoon)

Jetix Animation Concepts shows
These programmes are co-productions with Walt Disney Television Animation.
 Super Robot Monkey Team Hyperforce Go! (2004)
 Get Ed (2005)
 Yin Yang Yo! (2006)

Licensed shows
Other than their own co-produced shows, Jetix Europe also licensed the pay TV, free TV, home video, merchandising, and consumer product rights to other animated programs in Europe and the Middle East. Buena Vista International Television handled TV distribution to these shows.
 Captain Flamingo (Licensed from Breakthrough Entertainment, excluding France)
 Iggy Arbuckle (Licensed from Blueprint Entertainment, excluding France and German Free-TV rights)
 RoboRoach (Licensed from Portfolio Entertainment, including German pay TV rights)
 Pucca shorts (Licensed from VOOZ Character System)
 Shaman King (Licensed from TV Tokyo MediaNet)
 Sonic X (Licensed from TMS Entertainment)
 Tutenstein (Licensed from PorchLight Entertainment)
 Urban Vermin (Licensed from DHX Media, excluding France)

Channels

Main
 Central and Eastern Europe (Romania, Moldova, Russia, and Bulgaria) (Launched in February 1999, Rebranded as Jetix on January 1, 2005, and became Disney Channel on September 19, 2009. Russian version was split off and remained as Jetix)
 Central and Eastern Europe (Hungary, the Czech Republic, and Slovakia) Launched in Hungary in November 2000 and expanded to the Czech Republic and Slovakia in February 2001. Rebranded as Jetix on January 1, 2005, and became Disney Channel on September 19, 2009)
 Central and Eastern Europe (Bulgaria) (Launched in 2003, rebranded as Jetix on January 1, 2005, and became Disney Channel on September 19, 2009)
 France (Launched in November 1997, rebranded as Jetix on August 1, 2004, and became Disney XD on April 1, 2009)
 Germany (Launched in October 2000, rebranded as Jetix on June 10, 2005, and became Disney XD in October 2009)
 Greece (Launched in October 2001, rebranded as Jetix in January 2005, and became Disney XD on October 3, 2009)
 Italy (Launched in 2000, rebranded as Jetix in March 2005 and became Disney XD in September 2009)
 Israel (Launched on April 18, 2001, rebranded as Jetix in March 2005, and became Disney Channel on September 9, 2009)
 MENA (Middle East, Africa, and Turkey) (Launched in November 2000, rebranded as Jetix in January 2005 and became Disney XD in October 2009)
 Netherlands (Launched on August 2, 1997, Rebranded as Jetix in February 2005 and became Disney XD on January 1, 2010) 
 Poland (Launched on April 18, 1998, rebranded as Jetix on January 1, 2005, and became Disney XD on September 18, 2009)
 Russia (Split away from CEE feed in September 2009, and replaced with Disney Channel on August 10, 2010)
 Scandivania (Sweden, Denmark, Norway, Finland, Iceland, Lithuania, Latvia, and Estonia) (Launched on February 18, 1998, rebranded as Jetix in October 2004. Merged with Toon Disney Scandivania to create Disney XD on September 12, 2009)
 Spain (Launched in December 1998, rebranded as Jetix in January 2005 and became Disney XD in September 2009)
 United Kingdom and Ireland (Launched on October 1, 1996, and later expanded to Ireland. Rebranded as Jetix on January 1, 2005, and became Disney XD on August 31, 2009)

Other
 GXT (Italy) (Launched in 2005, sold off in 2009 and eventually closed in December 2014)
 GXT +1 (Italy) (Launched in 2008, timeshift of GXT)
 Jetix +1 (Italy) (Timeshift channel, Launched in 2002, renamed to Jetix +1 in 2005 and renamed Disney XD +1 in September 2009)
 Jetix +1 (Spain) (Timeshift channel, Launched in 2006, and renamed Disney XD +1 in September 2009)
 Jetix +1 (United Kingdom and Ireland) (Timeshift channel, Launched in 2000, renamed to Jetix +1 on January 1, 2005, and renamed Disney XD +1 on August 31, 2009)
 Jetix Play Central & Eastern Europe (Launched in January 2003, renamed Jetix Play in 2005, expanded to Romania and the Czech Republic in 2006. Closed on August 1, 2010, in most regions, on September 1, 2010, in Turkey and on March 12, 2011, in Romania)
 K-2 (Italy) (Originally launched as a syndicated Fox Kids branded block in 2001, and renamed K-2 on October 1, 2004. Sold off in 2009 (with the launch of a dedicated channel, shortening the name to K2) and is now owned by Warner Bros. Discovery, Inc.)

Sources

Mass media companies established in 1996
Mass media companies disestablished in 2019
Companies formerly listed on Euronext Amsterdam
Mass media companies of the Netherlands
Disney XD